Žiga Štern (born 2 January 1994) is a Slovenian male volleyball player who plays for VfB Friedrichshafen and the Slovenian national team. His position is an outside hitter. With Slovenia, Štern competed at the 2015 European Championship and the 2019 European Championship, where Slovenia finished in second place on both occasions.

Sporting achievements

National team
 2015  Men's European Volleyball Championship
 2019  Men's European Volleyball Championship
 2021  Men's European Volleyball Championship

References

External links
FIVB 2016 Stats
Player Details
Slovenia Men's Team Start Preparations for World League
WorldOfVolley

1994 births
Living people
Sportspeople from Maribor
Slovenian men's volleyball players
Slovenian expatriate sportspeople in France
Expatriate volleyball players in France
Slovenian expatriate sportspeople in Turkey
Expatriate volleyball players in Turkey
Slovenian expatriate sportspeople in Italy
Expatriate volleyball players in Italy
Slovenian expatriate sportspeople in Greece
Expatriate volleyball players in Greece
Slovenian expatriate sportspeople in Germany
Expatriate volleyball players in Germany